The Vratna monastery is a 14th-century Serbian Orthodox monastery in the village of Vratna in Negotin, Serbia, founded by Serbian king Stefan Milutin (1282–1321) of the Nemanjić dynasty and Saint Nikodim I. It is situated below the Vratna canyon and the nearby Vratna river flows through the village.

It was rebuilt in 1415 by Šarban from Struza attested in papers found by bishop Genadije in 1856. The monastery was damaged by fire in 1813 and renovated by 1817.

The monastery was torn down between World War I and World War II. It is since a female monastery (nunnery), one of three monasteries in Negotin.

See also 
 Prerast of Vratna River

References

Serbian Orthodox monasteries in Serbia
14th-century Serbian Orthodox church buildings